Bhai Virendra Yadav is an Indian politician. He was elected to the Bihar Legislative Assembly from Maner as 2010 Member of Bihar Legislative Assembly as a member of the Rashtriya Janata Dal. Currently he is serving as a Main spokesman of Bihar RJD Party. Yadav was interested to fight Patliputra Lok Sabha 2019 election but that was opposed by Tej Pratap Yadav due to his elder sister Misa Bharti contesting the seat and she was candidate for 2019 general election.

External links

References

Living people
1961 births
Bihari politicians
Magadh University alumni
Rashtriya Janata Dal politicians
Bihar MLAs 2010–2015
Bihar MLAs 2015–2020
People from Patna
Bihar MLAs 2020–2025